Several constitutional conventions have considered or proposed constitutions for the island of Ireland or for one of its two jurisdictions, Northern Ireland and the Republic of Ireland.

Notes

See also
 Irish question
 Partition of Ireland
 Irish nationalism and Irish unionism
 The Troubles and Northern Ireland peace process

References

Constitutional Conventions
Political history of Ireland
Constitutional Conventions
Ireland